Stoor may refer to: 

Stoor worm, or Mester Stoor Worm, was a gigantic evil sea serpent of Orcadian folklore
Stoor (Hobbit), a Middle-earth Hobbit. See Hobbit#Divisions
Fredrik Stoor (born 1984), a Swedish former professional footballer